Roberto Satoshi de Souza (born September 19, 1989) is a Japanese-Brazilian mixed martial artist who competes in the Lightweight division of Rizin Fighting Federation, where he is the current Rizin Lightweight champion.

Background 
Roberto Satoshi de Souza was born on September 19, 1989 in Sao Paulo, Brazil to a Brazilian father and Japanese mother and began practicing martial arts with his father at a young age, starting with Judo and later progressing to Jiu-Jitsu. He quickly gained success in the junior divisions of BJJ, winning multiple championships including the World Championship in both his weight category and the open weight category. However, after 2006, the World Jiu-Jitsu Championship was held in California, USA and Roberto struggled to secure sponsorships to compete abroad, leading to a temporary absence from the sport. He returned in 2009 and had a successful run for the world title. Roberto later visited Japan to see his brother Mauricio, who had opened an academy there, and decided to stay permanently. To make ends meet, he worked in factories before eventually being able to make a living through competing and teaching Jiu-Jitsu. On May 1, 2011, Roberto received his black belt from his father, Adilson de Souza, who passed away from an illness shortly after the ceremony.

He is married to a fellow Japanese Brazilian, Yuri Suzuki de Souza,  and has two daughters.

Brazilian Jiu-Jitsu grappling 
In July 2006, he won the Sao Paulo jiu-jitsu championship in two classes, blue belt medio class and absolute class. In September 2007, he came to Japan following his older brothers Mauricio Dai Souza and Marcos Yoshio Souza, and moved to Hamamatsu City ,Shizuoka Prefecture at the age of 18. When he first came to Japan, he worked as a factory worker while practicing and teaching at a bull terrier martial arts gym with his two older brothers.

On December 2, 2007, Satoshi participated in the DEEP X 02 Real King Tournament in the 76 kg class, winning the championship after defeating Takayuki Muramatsu, Kei Ouchi, and Sotaro Yamada in successive rounds.

In June 2009 and 2010, Satoshi won the World Jiu-Jitsu Championship in the purple and brown belt Lightweight categories, respectively.

On October 10, 2010, the subject participated in the DEEP X 06 Brazilian Jiu-Jitsu Super Tournament in the 75 kg class, defeating three black belt holders, Kei Ochi, Tetsuya Kondo, and Koji Shimazaki to win the championship.

In May 2011, Satoshi was awarded a black belt in Brazilian Jiu-Jitsu by their father.

In April 2012, Satoshi won the gold medals  at the Abu Dhabi World Professional Jiu-Jitsu Championship in the black belt Lightweight, defeating Davi Ramos and Lucas Lepri.

Facing Jake Shields on November 22, 2014 at Metamorphis 5, Satoshi drew with Shields as time expired, before returning at Metamoris 6 on May 9, 2015, where he faced Clark Gracie and drew once again due to time expiration.

In June 2017, the subject faced Lucas Lepri in the World Jiu-Jitsu Championship black belt lightweight final, but withdrew due to a shoulder injury and finished as runner-up.

On June 9, 2018, Satoshi participated in QUINTET FIGHT NIGHT in TOKYO as part of "TEAM HALEO", defeating Daisuke Nakamura, David Garmo, and Yoshihiko Matsumoto before going to a timed daw with Masahiro Iwasaki. On October 5, 2018, the subject participated in QUINTET.3 as part of "TEAM SAKURABA", drawing with Gordon Ryan of TEAM ALPHA MALE.

Mixed martial arts career 
He made his mixed martial arts debut on October 20, 2013 at the Real Fight MMA Championship 3 in China, before winning his sophomore performance against Doo Je Jung in December 2014 via rear-naked choke. On December 5, 2015, he faced Ryuki Ueyama in the first round of the REAL.3 super lightweight (74.2 kg) throne decision tournament, winning by arm-triangle choke. On March 12, 2016, he faced Yuta Kaneko in the semi-finals of the REAL.4 Super Lightweight Championship Tournament and won by TKO via ground and pound. On June 12, 2016, he faced Pat Ayuyu in the final of the REAL Super Lightweight Tournament, successfully winning the title and the tournament via first round armbar submission.

Rizin Fighting Federation 
After winning two bouts under the Arzalet banner via first round rear-naked chokes, Satoshi made his Rizin FF debut on April 21, 2019, when he faced Satoru Kitaoka at Rizin 15, winning by TKO in the second round via ground and pound.

On July 28, 2019, he faced Mizuto Hirota at Rizin 17 and won by knockout in the first round. During his post-fight mic performance , he yelled, "This is not UFC, this is RIZIN! "

On October 12, 2019, he faced Johnny Case in the Lightweight Grand Prix Quarterfinal at Rizin 19. He received an eye-poke in his left eye, and was tapped out 75 seconds after the start of the match. It was the first loss of his career.

On August 9, 2020, he faced Yusuke Yaji at Rizin 22 and won by first round TKO stoppage.

Satoshi faced Kazuki Tokudome at Rizin 27 on March 21, 2021. After getting taken down, he quickly submitted Tokudome via triangle choke in the first round.

On June 13, 2021, he faced RIZIN Lightweight World Grand Prix Champion Tofiq Musayev for the inaugural Rizin Lightweight Championship at Rizin 28 . In the 1st round, he won the ippon with a triangular choke and succeeded in winning his first title. During the national anthem before the bout, he chose Kimigayo instead of the Brazilian national anthem.

On December 31, 2021, he rematched the challenger Yusuke Yaji in the RIZIN lightweight title match at Rizin 33.  He made his first successful defense of the throne .

On April 17, 2022, in the RIZIN lightweight title match of Rizin 35, he rematched the challenger Johnny Case for the first time in about two and a half years, and won in the first round via reverse triangle armbar. Succeeded in his revenge and successfully defended the title for the second time.

Satoshi faced former Bellator Featherweight World Championship A. J. McKee in a non-title bout at Bellator MMA vs. Rizin on December 31, 2022. Although there were many submission attempts made by de Souza, McKee had more offense and won the bout by unanimous decision.

Satoshi is scheduled to face Spike Carlyle in a non-title bout at Rizin 42 on May 6, 2023.

Championships and accomplishments

Mixed martial arts 
Rizin Fighting Federation
 Rizin Lightweight Championship (One time, current)
 Two successful title defenses
 Real Fight Championship
 RFC Super Lightweight Champship

Mixed martial arts record

|-
| Loss
|align=center|14–2
|A. J. McKee
|Decision (unanimous)
|Bellator MMA vs. Rizin
|
|align=center|3
|align=center|5:00
|Saitama, Japan
|
|-
|Win
|align=center|14–1
|Johnny Case
|Submission (reverse triangle armbar)
|Rizin 35
|
|align=center|1
|align=center|3:32
|Chōfu, Japan
|
|-
|Win
|align=center|13–1
|Yusuke Yachi
|Submission (triangle choke)
|Rizin 33
|
|align=center|2
|align=center|3:30
|Saitama, Japan
| 
|-
|Win
|align=center|12–1
|Tofiq Musayev
|Submission (triangle choke)
|Rizin 28
|
|align=center|1
|align=center|1:12
|Tokyo, Japan
|
|-
|Win
|align=center|11–1
|Kazuki Tokudome
|Submission (triangle choke)
|Rizin 27
|
|align=center|1
|align=center|1:44
|Nagoya, Japan
|
|-
|Win
|align=center|10–1
|Yusuke Yachi
|TKO (punches)
|Rizin 22
|
|align=center|1
|align=center|1:52
|Yokohama, Japan
|
|-
|Loss
|align=center|9–1
|Johnny Case
|TKO (punch)
|Rizin 19
|
|align=center|1
|align=center|1:15
|Osaka, Japan
|
|-
|Win
|align=center|9–0
|Mizuto Hirota
|KO (punches)
|Rizin 17
|
|align=center|1
|align=center|3:05
|Tokyo, Japan
|
|-
|Win
|align=center|8–0
|Satoru Kitaoka
|TKO (punches)
|Rizin 15
|
|align=center|2
|align=center|3:56
|Yokohama, Japan
|
|-
|Win
|align=center|7–0
|Seung Dae Baek
|Submission (rear-naked choke)
|Arzalet Fighting 4
|
|align=center|1
|align=center|1:06
|Seoul, South Korea
|
|-
|Win
|align=center|6–0
|Thiago Oliveira
|Submission (rear-naked choke)
|Arzalet Fighting 2
|
|align=center|1
|align=center|3:00
|Curitiba, Brazil
| 
|-
|Win
|align=center|5–0
|Pat Ayuyu
|Submission (armbar)
|Real Fight Championship 5
|
|align=center|1
|align=center|1:54
|Tokyo, Japan
| 
|-
|Win
|align=center|4–0
|Yuta Kaneko
|TKO (punches)
|Real Fight Championship 4
|
|align=center|1
|align=center|2:06
|Tokyo, Japan
| 
|-
|Win
|align=center|3–0
|Ryuki Ueyama
|Submission (arm-triangle choke)
|Real Fight Championship 3
|
|align=center| 1
|align=center| 2:13
|Yokohama, Japan
|
|-
|Win
|align=center| 2–0
|Doo Je Jung
|Submission (rear-naked choke)
|Real Fight Championship 1
|
|align=center|1
|align=center|1:05
|Tokyo, Japan
| 
|-
|Win
|align=center| 1–0
|Nuerla Murati
|Submission (rear-naked choke)
|Real Fight MMA Championship 3
|
|align=center|1
|align=center|2:37
|Beijing, China
|

See also 

 List of current Rizin FF fighters
 List of male mixed martial artists

Footnotes 

Brazilian male mixed martial artists
Japanese male mixed martial artists
Mixed martial artists utilizing Brazilian jiu-jitsu
Mixed martial artists utilizing shootboxing
Brazilian practitioners of Brazilian jiu-jitsu
Japanese practitioners of Brazilian jiu-jitsu
People awarded a black belt in Brazilian jiu-jitsu
Japanese people of Brazilian descent
People from Shizuoka Prefecture
1989 births
Living people
Sportspeople from São Paulo